Velipuolikuu (lit. half-brother moon or brother half-moon, a pun in the form of a doubly compounded word) was a Finnish sketch comedy show that aired in 1983 on YLE. The series featured actors Pirkka-Pekka Petelius, Kari Heiskanen, Esko Hukkanen, Robin Relander, and Niko Saarela, among others.

One of the show's memorable parts became Pirkka-Pekka Petelius' rendition of Muistan sua Elaine (composed by Alvar Kosunen and  written by Matti Jurva) which often played at the end of the show. The song became so popular that it was released the following year on an album by the same name.

External links

Finnish television sketch shows